Ratnavaram is a village and Gram panchayat of Nadigudem mandal, Nalgonda district, in Telangana state. The closest town to Ratnavaram is Kodad.

References

Villages in Nalgonda district